La Bohème is a 1965 West German film production of the 1896 opera of the same name by Puccini, filmed in a Milan studio and recorded at the Munich Opera. The film director and producer and set designer was the Italian director Franco Zeffirelli; Herbert von Karajan conducted the chorus and orchestra of La Scala and was the artistic supervisor. This is not a stage live recording: the singers mime to their own pre-recordings.

Cast

References

External links 
 

1965 films
1965 musical films
German musical films
West German films
Films based on La bohème
Films based on works by Giuseppe Giacosa
Films set in Paris
Films set in the 19th century
Opera films
1960s German films